Jelle Nijdam (born 16 August 1963) is a Dutch former professional road cyclist. Nijdam turned professional after the 1984 Summer Olympics in Los Angeles. He participated in the Tour de France 10 times, winning six stages and wearing the yellow jersey for three days. Nijdam's father, Henk Nijdam, was a professional cyclist from 1962 to 1969, who won the 1962 world amateur track pursuit championship. He also competed in the individual pursuit and team pursuit events at the 1984 Summer Olympics.

Career achievements

Major results

1984
 Olympia's Tour
1st Prologue & Stage 7b (ITT)
1985 
 1st  Overall Tour de Luxembourg
 1st Grand Prix Impanis
 Tour of Sweden
1st Prologue & Stage 3 
 1st Prologue Tour of Belgium
 3rd GP Stad Vilvoorde
 4th Overall Three Days of De Panne
1986
 1st Prologue Ronde van Nederland
 1st Stage 3b (ITT) Tour de Luxembourg
 3rd Overall Danmark Rundt
1st  Young rider classification
1st Stage 1 
 3rd Overall Tour of Sweden
1st Prologue 
 7th Ronde van Limburg
 9th Overall Three Days of De Panne
1987
 1st  Overall Tour de l'Oise
1st Prologue 
 1st Dwars door België
 Tour de France
1st Prologue 
Held  &  after Prologue  
Held  after Prologue & Stage 1 
 1st Prologue Ronde van Nederland
 1st Prologue Danmark Rundt
 1st Prologue Tour of Sweden
 1st Prologue Four Days of Dunkirk
 2nd E3 Prijs Vlaanderen
1988
 1st Amstel Gold Race
 Tour de France
1st Stage 5 
Held  after Stages 6–7
 1st Stage 3 Vuelta Asturias
 3rd Kuurne–Brussels–Kuurne
 4th Overall Three Days of De Panne
 5th Grand Prix Eddy Merckx
 8th Overall Ronde van Nederland
1st Prologue & Stage 5 (ITT)
1989
 1st Paris–Tours
 1st Paris–Brussels
 Tour de France
1st Stages 4 & 14
 1st Stage 1 Ronde van Nederland
 1st Stage 1 Nissan Classic
 1st Stage 3 Vuelta Asturias
 1st Prologue Tour of Sweden
 2nd Overall Three Days of De Panne
 2nd Overall Tour de l'Oise
1st Stage 2 
 5th Veenendaal–Veenendaal
 9th Grand Prix de la Libération
1990
 1st  Overall Ronde van Nederland
1st Prologue 
 1st Binche-Tournai-Binche
 1st Stage 6 Tour de France
 1st Stage 2 Vuelta a Murcia
 Four Days of Dunkirk
1st Stages 5 & 6 (ITT)
 2nd Grand Prix Eddy Merckx
 2nd Kuurne–Brussels–Kuurne
 3rd Overall Tour of Sweden
1st Prologue & Stage 4 
 3rd Amstel Gold Race
 4th E3 Prijs Vlaanderen
 4th Paris–Brussels
1991
 1st  Overall Three Days of De Panne
1st Stages 1b (ITT) & 3 
 1st Stage 5 Tour de France
 Tour Méditerranéen
1st Stages 2 & 3b (ITT)
 3rd Circuit des Frontières
 4th Grand Prix Eddy Merckx
 5th Omloop Het Volk
 6th Le Samyn
 8th Kuurne–Brussels–Kuurne
 9th Overall Ronde van Nederland
1st Prologue 
 9th Amstel Gold Race
1992
 1st  Overall Ronde van Nederland
1st Prologue & Stage 2b (ITT)
 1st Grand Prix Eddy Merckx
 Vuelta a España
1st Stage 1 (ITT) 
Held  after Stages 1–2a
 1st Stage 7 Vuelta a Aragón
 3rd Omloop van het Houtland
 5th Overall Three Days of De Panne
 5th Gent–Wevelgem
 5th Baden-Baden (with Frans Maassen)
 6th Tour of Flanders
 7th E3 Prijs Vlaanderen
 8th Grand Prix des Nations
 8th Veenendaal–Veenendaal
 9th Amstel Gold Race
 9th Omloop Het Volk
1993
 1st Stage 3b (ITT) Three Days of De Panne
 1st Stage 2 Vuelta Asturias
 1st Prologue Tour DuPont
 2nd Overall Ronde van Nederland
 2nd Paris–Brussels
 3rd E3 Prijs Vlaanderen
 3rd Grand Prix Eddy Merckx
 5th Grand Prix des Nations
 6th Scheldeprijs
 9th Ronde van Limburg
1994
 1st Kampioenschap van Vlaanderen
 1st De Kustpijl
 4th Le Samyn
 5th Overall Tour de l'Oise
 5th Scheldeprijs
1995
 1st  Overall Ronde van Nederland
1st Stage 5 
 1st  Overall Tour de l'Oise
1st Stage 1 
 1st Dwars door België
 1st Binche-Tournai-Binche
 1st Stage 6 Vuelta a Aragón
 2nd Nationale Sluitingsprijs
 5th Omloop Het Volk
 6th Overall Danmark Rundt
 7th Time trial, National Road Championships
 7th Overall Étoile de Bessèges
 7th Grand Prix de Wallonie
 7th Omloop van het Houtland
1996
 1st Ronde van Midden-Zeeland
 2nd Nokere Koerse
 3rd Time trial, National Road Championships
 8th Omloop Het Volk

Grand Tour general classification results timeline

See also
 List of Dutch Olympic cyclists
 List of Dutch cyclists who have led the Tour de France general classification

References

External links 

Official Tour de France results for Jelle Nijdam
CyclingNews Interview - Joe Parkin says Jelle Nijdam was the meanest rider he ever rode with.

1963 births
Living people
Dutch male cyclists
Dutch Tour de France stage winners
Cyclists from Zundert
Tour de France prologue winners
Olympic cyclists of the Netherlands
Cyclists at the 1984 Summer Olympics